Aldene Forbes (born 8 August 1978) is a Caymanian footballer who plays as a midfielder. He represented the Cayman Islands including in a World Cup qualifying match in 2010.

References

External links
 
 

Association football midfielders
Living people
1978 births
Caymanian footballers
Cayman Islands international footballers